Rachel Leah Ramras (born December 20, 1974) is an American actress, comedian and television writer. In 2017, she, Hugh Davidson and Larry Dorf created and starred in their own TV series, Nobodies.

Ramras has written for Mike Tyson Mysteries on Adult Swim, for which she also voices Mike Tyson's daughter, Yung Hee. Ramras was one of the main writers of The Looney Tunes Show, addition to co-writing direct-to-video film titled Looney Tunes: Rabbits Run and voicing Lola Bunny. She was also a writer on the Disney Channel series The Buzz on Maggie, where she was credited as "Rachel Duguay". She is a member of The Groundlings.

Filmography

Actress

Writer

References

External links
Official facebook 

1974 births
Living people
Actresses from Phoenix, Arizona
American television writers
American voice actresses
American women television writers
Screenwriters from Arizona
Writers from Phoenix, Arizona
21st-century American women